Józef Michał Łukasiewicz (died after 1794), was a Polish merchant and politician. He served as President of Warsaw for two terms: in 1792-93 and 1794-96. He was an associate of Jan Dekert.

References
  Adam Skałkowski, Towarzystwo przyjaciół konstytucji 3 maja, Kórnik, 1930, s. 73.

Year of birth missing
Year of death missing
Mayors of Warsaw
18th-century Polish–Lithuanian businesspeople
Polish merchants